Jowzdan Rural District is a rural district (dehestan) in the Central District of Najafabad County, Isfahan Province, Iran. At the 2006 census, its population (including Jowzdan, which was subsequently detached from the rural district and promoted to city status) was 9,098, in 2,231 families; excluding Jowzdan, its population (as of 2006) was 2,702, in 670 families.  The rural district has 11 villages.

References 

Rural Districts of Isfahan Province
Najafabad County